Euros of Hollywood is an American reality documentary television series on Bravo that premiered on November 3, 2014. Bravo announced the series in April, 2014, as a show featuring a group of Europeans trying to make success in America. The nine-episode season concluded on December 30, 2014.

Premise 
The reality series follows six people from different European countries who all live in Los Angeles and try to deal with their own cultural differences while striving to achieve their version of the American Dream. The show features diverse and very ambitious people, "from a pop diva known as the “Madonna of Albania” to a Prada-wearing Italian Renaissance man whose goal is to win an Oscar." The cast members include Isabel Adrian, Massimo Dobrovic, Fawni, Sascha Gerecht, Jannik Olander, and Bleona Qereti.

Cast 
 Isabel Adrian is a Swedish television personality who has built a successful career back home as a model, designer and stylist. She is married to DJ Steve Angello of the music group Swedish House Mafia.
 Massimo Dobrovic is an Italian actor, model and choreographer, whose one of the biggest dreams is winning an Oscar. After escaping Croatia during the war as a boy and making a career as an actor in Italy, Massimo is ready to make it even bigger in America.
 Fawni is an Austrian singer-songwriter, artist and actress. However, after a troublesome divorce from her husband-producer, Fawni is ready to put her both personal and professional life back together.
 Sascha Gerecht is a German DJ, music producer, clothing designer, and night club and restaurant owner. Sascha has moved to Los Angeles to explore any business opportunities, including his own clothing brand and music career.
 Jannik Olander is a Danish jewelry designer and entrepreneur. He began his career working at Ralph Lauren and later founded Nialaya Jewelry, a jewelry brand that is popular with many celebrities in America. In 2011, he opened his first retail outlet on LA's trendy Melrose Avenue.
 Bleona Qereti is an Albanian recording artist and actress. Bleona has been a famous singer in Eastern Europe for over a decade and has released multiple albums throughout her career.

Episodes

Broadcast
In Australia, the first episode premiered on Arena on January 1, 2015, before the full series began on February 3, 2015.

References

External links 

 
 
 

2010s American reality television series
2014 American television series debuts
2014 American television series endings
English-language television shows
Bravo (American TV network) original programming